Serhiy Tulub (born 13 August 1953, Donetsk) is a Ukrainian politician and minister of energy (1999-2000, 2004-2005) and coal mining (1998–1999, 2006-2007).

See also 
 FC Cherkaskyi Dnipro

External links 
 Serhiy Tulub at the Official Ukraine Today portal

1953 births
Living people
Politicians from Donetsk
Party of Regions politicians
Fuel and energy ministers of Ukraine
Coal mining ministers of Ukraine
Governors of Cherkasy Oblast
Energoatom
Fifth convocation members of the Verkhovna Rada
Sixth convocation members of the Verkhovna Rada
Recipients of the Order of State
Recipients of the Order of Prince Yaroslav the Wise, 5th class
Recipients of the Order of Merit (Ukraine), 3rd class
Laureates of the State Prize of Ukraine in Science and Technology
Laureates of the Honorary Diploma of the Verkhovna Rada of Ukraine
Recipients of the Honorary Diploma of the Cabinet of Ministers of Ukraine